Kosmos 257 ( meaning Cosmos 257), known before launch as DS-P1-Yu No.17, was a Soviet satellite which was used as a radar calibration target for tests of anti-ballistic missiles. It was built by the Yuzhnoye Design Bureau, and launched in 1968 as part of the Dnepropetrovsk Sputnik programme.

Kosmos 257 was launched from Site 133/1 at Plesetsk, atop a Kosmos-2I 63SM carrier rocket. The launch occurred on 3 December 1968 at 14:52:21 UTC, and resulted in Kosmos 257's successful deployment into low Earth orbit. Upon reaching orbit, it was assigned its Kosmos designation, and received the International Designator 1968-107A.

It remained in orbit until it decayed and reentered the atmosphere on 5 March 1969. It was the seventeenth of seventy nine DS-P1-Yu satellites to be launched, and the sixteenth of seventy two to successfully reach orbit.

See also

1968 in spaceflight

References

Spacecraft launched in 1968
Kosmos satellites
Dnepropetrovsk Sputnik program